Hobby ZR-84 was an educational and home computer developed by MICROSYS Beočin in SFRY (now Serbia) in 1984.

Specifications
 CPU: Z80A running at 4 MHz
 ROM: 12 KB BASIC
 Primary memory: 16 KB (expandable up to 48 KB)
 Secondary storage: cassette tape, floppy drive
 Display: text mode 16 lines with 64 characters each; low-res graphics mode 128x48
 Sound: separate board
 I/O ports: composite and RF video, cassette tape storage, and expansion connector

References

External links
 http://forum.benchmark.rs/showthread.php?323083-Hobby-ZR-84-intervju

Home computers
Z80-based home computers